Marian Matthews is an American politician, educator, and attorney serving as a member of the New Mexico House of Representatives from the 27th district, which includes a portion of Bernalillo County, New Mexico.

Education 
Matthews earned a Bachelor of Arts degree from Missouri State University and a Juris Doctor from the University of New Mexico School of Law.

Career 
Matthews began her career as a newspaper reporter in Springfield, Missouri and Alamogordo, New Mexico.

Prior to serving in the New Mexico House of Representatives, Matthews worked as a prosecutor and deputy attorney general of New Mexico under then-Attorney General Tom Udall. Matthews later worked as an instructor at the Central New Mexico Community College. Matthews was appointed to the House by the Bernalillo County Commission January 7, 2020, succeeding first-term legislator William "Bill" Pratt, who died in office.

References 

Women state legislators in New Mexico
Democratic Party members of the New Mexico House of Representatives
Living people
Missouri State University alumni
University of New Mexico School of Law alumni
New Mexico lawyers
Year of birth missing (living people)
21st-century American women